Nigel Richard Clark (born 18 September 1966 in Redditch, Worcestershire, England) is an English singer-songwriter, best known as the lead singer and bassist of Dodgy.

Life and career
Clark returned to performing in 2005 as a solo artist. This new project received a positive review from Q magazine. He released his debut album  21st Century Man, on 20 November 2006.

In 2007, Clark teamed up with dance music duo SFG to produce a new version of Dodgy's "Good Enough". SFG (which stands for Sunshine Feel Good) had been writing dance tracks together in their Hereford recording studio for two years. The group consists of Jon Sidwell and Andrew Marston. BMG Music Publishing, who own the copyright to "Good Enough", allowed the reworking in July 2007, and the single is available as a white label.

Clark currently works as a music teacher at "The Aspire Academy" in Worcester, and lives with his wife and two children

References

1966 births
Living people
English male singers
English rock guitarists
English rock bass guitarists
Male bass guitarists
People from Redditch
Britpop musicians
Dodgy members